John Bennett (March 7, 1959–2004) was a British scuba diver who set a world record by becoming the first person to deep dive below a depth of  on self-contained breathing apparatus on 6 November 2001. Bennett first broke the record in 1999 when he reached  accompanied by Chuck Driver. Having founded Atlantis Dive in the Philippines in the late 1990s, Bennett and his world record breaking team, including Ron Loos, Mark Cox and Targa Mann went on to establish Tech Dive Academy in Port Douglas, Australia. In the early 2000s, Bennett and Loos made the first dives to the  wreck site in Manila Bay. In 2001, he located the wreck of the Imperial Japanese Navy dreadnought Yamashiro through sound scans, but could not confirm it before his death. Confirmation was not made until 2017.

Death

John Bennett went missing on 15 March 2004 in a commercial diving incident in Korea. He was declared legally dead in 2006, but his body has never been recovered. Bennett was survived by his wife Gabby and their two children, Joshua and Katie.

See also

 World's deepest SCUBA dives

References

External links
 Video of record 308m dive
 John Bennett Memorial Fund-in Memoriam

 

1959 births
2004 deaths
British underwater divers
Commercial diving accidents
People declared dead in absentia
Professional divers
Underwater diving deaths